Elizabeth station may refer to:

 Elizabeth railway station, a commuter rail station in Adelaide, South Australia
 Elizabeth station (Central Railroad of New Jersey), a disused railway station in Elizabeth, New Jersey
 Elizabeth station (Illinois), a historic railway station in Elizabeth, Illinois
 Elizabeth station (NJ Transit), a commuter rail station in Elizabeth, New Jersey

Similarly named stations:
 Elizabeth & Hawthorne station, a streetcar stop in Charlotte, North Carolina 
 Elizabeth City station, a historic railway station in Elizabeth City, North Carolina
 Elisabeth metro station, a rapid transit station in Brussels, Belgium
 Elizabeth Quay bus station, a bus terminal in Perth, Western Australia
 Elizabeth Quay railway station, a railway station in Perth, Western Australia
 Elizabeth South railway station, commuter rail station in suburban Adelaide, Australia
 North Elizabeth station, a commuter rail station in Elizabeth, New Jersey
 Port Elizabeth railway station, a railway station in Gqeberha, South Africa

Other
 Air Force Station Port Elizabeth, a South African Air Force facility in Port Elizabeth, Eastern Cape Province, South Africa
 Coast Guard Air Station Elizabeth City, a USCG facility in Elizabeth City, North Carolina
 Mount Elizabeth Station, a cattle station in Western Australia
 Queen Elizabeth Power Station, a natural gas generating station in Saskatoon, Saskatchewan, Canada

See also
 Elizabeth (disambiguation)